Proelauna is a monotypic genus of African sheet weavers containing the single species, Proelauna humicola. It was first described by R. Jocqué in 1981, and has only been found in Malawi, Tanzania, and Angola.

See also
 List of Linyphiidae species (I–P)

References

Linyphiidae
Monotypic Araneomorphae genera
Spiders of Africa